Raoul Levy (14 April 1922 – 31 December 1966) was a French film producer, writer and director best known for a series of movies he made starring Brigitte Bardot. He was born in Antwerp.

Biography
He committed suicide after losing most of his fortune making a film about the life of Marco Polo. He shot himself in the chest outside the front door of the St Tropez house of Isabelle Pons, who had recently ended a two-year affair with Levy.

Levy was survived by a wife and fifteen-year-old son.

Select credits
Paris Vice Squad (1951) – producer
The Proud and the Beautiful (1953) – associate producer
And God Created Woman (1956) – producer, writer
The Night Heaven Fell (1958) – producer
Love Is My Profession (1958) – producer
Babette Goes to War (1959) – producer, story
 (1960) – producer
Seven Days... Seven Nights (1960) – producer
The Truth (1960) – producer
Marco the Magnificent (1965) – producer, writer, director
Hail, Mafia (1965) – producer, writer, director
The Defector (1966) – producer, writer, director
Two or Three Things I Know About Her (1967) – producer

References

External links
 at IMDb

1966 suicides
1922 births
French film directors
Suicides by firearm in France
Mass media people from Antwerp
Belgian emigrants to France
1966 deaths